The year 1655 in music involved some significant events.

Events 
Composer Johann Rosenmüller is imprisoned as the result of a scandal concerning alleged homosexual activities.

Publications

Classical music 
Giovanni Legrenzi – Op. 2, a collection of sonatas

Opera 
Giuseppe Alfiero – La fedeltà trionfante (lost)

Births 
May 4 – Bartolomeo Cristofori, inventor of the piano (died 1731)
August 13 – Johann Christoph Denner, wind instrument maker (died 1707)
probable – Robert de Visée, lutenist, guitarist, theorbist and violin player (died c.1732)

Deaths 
April 4 – Johann Erasmus Kindermann, organist and composer (born 1616)
July 30 – Sigmund Theophil Staden, German composer (born 1607)

References 

 
17th century in music
Music by year